St. Mary of the Mountain[s] and Our Lady of the Mountain[s] are among the many titles of Mary, mother of Jesus. Among dedications using the titles are:
 Abbey of St Maria del Monte (founded 1001), Benedictine monastery in Cesena, Italy
 Bellapais Abbey (founded c.1200), Cyprus
 Santa Maria del Monte de Cea, León, Spain
 St. Mary's of the Mountain Church (built 1839), Hunter, Greene County, New York, United States
 Our Lady of the Mountain, Colombia
 Our Lady of the Mount Catholic Church (Honolulu)
 Notre-Dame-des-Monts, Quebec, Canada
 Notre-Dame-de-Monts, Vendée, France

See also
 Our Lady of Mount Carmel

Titles of Mary